Syed Abdus Samad (6 December 1895 – 2 February 1964) was a British Indian football player from Bengal. Dubbed "Football Jadukor", he played for India national football team in 1924 and captained it in 1926. He played as a forward. Samad's football career lasted from 1915–1938.

Early life 
Samad was born in 1895 in Burdwan, Bengal Presidency (now in West Bengal) in British India. His family later settled in Moulvitola. He left school during his studies in the eighth grade. Samad displayed his talents in football from his early boyhood, and was influenced by headmaster of his school – Piyare Mohan Mookherji. Beside football, he began playing both cricket and tennis. Samad's father Syed Fazlul Bari was a government employee while his grandfather had been posted as "Sadre Alaa" (a higher judicial post at that time).

Playing career

Youth career
Samad played football for Purnia Zilla School in interschool tournament, and he scored all ten goals for his team in their 10–0 win against Umapati Kumar's Kishanganj Higher English School in a match. He also helped his school team winning the prestigious Fawcus Cup. He first drew attention of the football club managers of Calcutta when he played for the Purnia Junior Football Club.

Senior career
He joined the Calcutta Main Town Club in 1912. During 1915–1920, he played for Tajhat Football Club of Rangpur. Dukhiram Majumder was one of founding members of Aryan Club in 1888, was responsible for bringing up players like Samad. Samad also took first football training from him. In 1927, he joined Victoria Sporting Club of Dhaka.

In 1916, Samad played in a match against Somerset Football Team of England. He played for Calcutta Orients Club in 1918. He joined East Bengal Railway Club in 1921 and played until 1930. With the team, he won All-India Railway Championship thrice. At that time in 1927, the club achieved runner-up position in Durand Cup. Samad scored the most memorable trophy-winning goal of his career in 1927 against the Sherwood Forestry Team patronised by the Chief of the British Indian Army Lieutenant General Sherwood Mall.

As a member of India national team, he toured Burma, Ceylon, Hong Kong, China, Java, Sumatra, Malay, Borneo, Singapore and Britain. In a match played against China in Peking, he played as a substitute player in the second half and scored four goals in a row to give his side a 4–3 victory after trailing 0–3 in the first half.

In 1931, Mohun Bagan acquired the services of Samad, where he played alongside legendary players including Gostha Pal, Karuna Bhattacharya, Umapati Kumar, Sanmatha Dutta, Balaidas Chatterjee, Satu Chowdhury, and Bimal Mukherjee.

At the age of 38, he joined the Mohammedan Sporting Club and played in during 1933–1938, club's "golden age". In 1933, Mohammedan qualified for the first division of Calcutta Football League for the first time in its history. Mohammedan became the first native club to capture the Calcutta Football League title in 1934, in their very first year in top division which was a rare feat. The club became Senior Division champion five years in a row from 1934 to 1938. In 1936, Sporting became the second Indian club to win IFA Shield. In the same year, due to a serious injury, Samad's playing career came to an end.

Personal life and legacy
After the partition of India in 1947, Samad settled in Parbatipur Upazila of Dinajpur in East Pakistan. He was employed at the Pakistan Eastern Railway. In 1957, he was appointed as coach of National Sports Council Board. He was recipient of the Pride of Performance (President's Award) in 1962.

Samad had a son named Golam Hossain. Together they played for Railway team in 1944. He died on 2 February 1964 in Parbatipur Upazila. In 1969, Parbatipur Railway Institute was renamed to Samad Institute in his memory. East Pakistan (later Bangladesh) Government released a postal stamp commemorating him in 1969. Bangladesh Football Federation organizes the annual "Jadukar Samad Smriti Football Tournament". Later, the Government of Bangladesh also launched a postage stamp series in his memory. Later, Samad Milanayatan was built in his memory in Parbatipur, by the Bangladesh Railway.

Honours
East Bengal Railway
Durand Cup runner-up: 1927
Mohammedan Sporting
Calcutta Football League: 1934, 1935, 1936, 1937, 1938
IFA Shield: 1936

Individual
 Presidential Pride of Performance: 1962 (by the Government of Pakistan)

See also

History of Indian football
History of the India national football team
List of India national football team captains
Football in Bangladesh

Bibliography

Dutta, P. L., Memoir of 'Father of Indian Football' Nagendraprasad Sarbadhikary (Calcutta: N. P. Sarbadhikary Memorial Committee, 1944) (hereafter Memoir)

Ghosh, Saurindra Kumar. Krira Samrat Nagendraprasad Sarbadhikary 1869–1940 (Calcutta: N. P. Sarbadhikary Memorial Committee, 1963) (hereafter Krira Samrat).

References

External links
Samad: Football Wizard of India – article by S. A. Nasar at Booksie.com (archived 29 September 2020)

1890s births
1964 deaths
Footballers from Bihar
India international footballers
Mohammedan SC (Kolkata) players
Mohun Bagan AC players
Association football forwards
Indian footballers
People from Parbatipur Upazila
Pakistani people of Bihari descent
Calcutta Football League players